Fat Boy, fatboy or fat boys may refer to:

Arts, entertainment and media

Music
 Fatboy Slim, an English DJ and musician
 The Fat Boys, an American hip hop trio from Brooklyn, New York
 James Onen a Ugandan DJ aka Fatboy

Albums and songs
 Fatboy (album), 1992 album by moe
 "Fat Boy", a 1994 song by Max-A-Million
 "Fat Boy", a 2007 song by Bizarre from Blue Cheese & Coney Island

Fiction
 Fatboy (EastEnders), fictional character
 Run Fatboy Run, 2007 comedy film
 Fatboy, a play by John Clancy

Products
 Harley-Davidson FLSTF Fat Boy, softail-style cruiser motorcycle
 Fatboy, sofa designed by Finnish designer Jukka Setälä
 FatBoy, popular ice cream from Casper's Ice Cream company
 The Fat Boy, model rocket produced by Estes Industries
 The Fat Boy (hamburger) hamburger popular in Winnipeg, Manitoba

Other
 "Fat Boy", one of the victims in the Glasgow Ice Cream Wars

See also
 Fat Man (disambiguation)